"Mother Fuck" (stylized as "M*ther F**k") is a song by French rapper Jul featuring vocals from French rapper SCH. It was released on 11 December 2020, as a single from Jul's album Loin du monde. It topped the French Singles Chart.

Charts

References

2020 singles
2020 songs
French-language songs
Number-one singles in France
SCH (rapper) songs